The Qaradagh District is a district of Sulaymaniyah Governorate in Kurdistan Region, Iraq. Its main town is Qaradagh.

References 

Districts of Sulaymaniyah Province
Geography of Iraqi Kurdistan